St. James School and similar name forms may refer to:

 St James School, Exeter, Devon, England
 St James School, Grimsby, Lincolnshire, England
 St James's School, Dudley, West Midlands, England
 St. James School, Maryland, United States
 St. James School, Ohio, United States
 Saint James School (Montgomery, Alabama), United States
 St. James' School (Kolkata), West Bengal, India
 St. James' School, Binnaguri, Jalpaiguri, West Bengal, India

See also 
 Multiple countries
 St. James Elementary School (disambiguation)
 St. James Academy (disambiguation)
 Saint James School of Medicine, Anguilla and Saint Vincent and the Grenadines
 Canada
 Saint James Catholic High School (Guelph), Ontario
 St. James Collegiate, Manitoba
 Philippines
 St. James High School (Philippines)
 United Kingdom
 St James' Catholic High School, Colindale, London, England
 St James' Catholic High School, Stockport, Greater Manchester, England
 St James's Church of England High School, Farnworth, Greater Manchester, England
 St James Independent Schools, England
 United States
 St. James High School (Louisiana)
 St. James High School (Ferndale, Michigan)
 Saint James High School (New Jersey), Carneys Point Township, New Jersey
 St. James High School for Boys, Pennsylvania
 St. James High School (South Carolina)
 St. James Middle School, South Carolina
 St. James Parish Public Schools, Louisiana